Gahs or GAHS may refer to:
 Mohamed Gahs (born 1963), Moroccan journalist and politician
 Gallia Academy High School (Gallipolis, Ohio), United States
 Galway Archaeological and Historical Society, Ireland
 Gardiner High School (Maine), Gardiner, Maine, United States
 Gary Allan High School, Halton, Ontario, Canada
 General Amherst High School, Amherstburg, Ontario, Canada
 Greater Astoria Historical Society, New York City, United States
 Glen Allen High School, Glen Allen, Virginia, United States

See also 
 Gah (disambiguation)